Maria Stella Masocco (born 17 March 1948) is a former Italian discus thrower and shot putter.

She is the mother of the volleyball players Guendalina and Veronica Buffon as well as the former goalkeeper of the national football team Gigi Buffon.

Career
Her personal bests, 57.54 m set in 1973, at the end of the 2020 outdoor season is still the 8th best all-time performance of the Italian lists. She sets national record as in shot put as in discus throw.

National titles
Masocco won three national championships at individual senior level.

Italian Athletics Championships
Shot put: 1971, 1972 (2)
Italian Athletics Indoor Championships
Shot put: 1972

See also
 Italian all-time top lists - Discus throw

References

External links
 BUFFON, Adriano & MASOCCO, Maria Stella 

1948 births
Living people
Italian female discus throwers
Italian female shot putters
Athletes (track and field) at the 1971 Mediterranean Games
Mediterranean Games silver medalists for Italy
Mediterranean Games medalists in athletics
20th-century Italian women
21st-century Italian women
Buffon family